Whale Cove is a cove on Grand Manan Island in North Head, New Brunswick, Canada. It is located in the northern part of the island, on the Bay of Fundy, near North Head. The cove's once busy fishing wharf was destroyed in the Groundhog gale of 1976.

Climate

Notable residents 

The American writer Willa Cather began spending her summers in Whale Cove in 1921 and eventually had a cottage built there. The cottage is still open to the public as a tourist site.

References 

Neighbourhoods in New Brunswick